The 2014–15 Liga Leumit was the 16th season as second tier since its re-alignment in 1999 and the 73rd season of second-tier football in Israel.

A total of sixteen teams are contesting in the league, including eleven sides from the 2013–14 season, the three promoted teams from 2013–14 Liga Alef and the two relegated teams from 2013–14 Israeli Premier League.

Changes from 2013–14 season

Team changes
Maccabi Netanya and Hapoel Petah Tikva, were promoted to the 2014–15 Israeli Premier League.

Hapoel Nir Ramat HaSharon and Bnei Yehuda Tel Aviv were directly relegated to the 2014–15 Liga Leumit after finishing the 2013–14 Israeli Premier League season in the bottom two places.

Hapoel Ashkelon, and Maccabi Umm al-Fahm were directly relegated to Liga Alef after finishing in the previous season in last two league places. They were replaced by Hapoel Kfar Saba and Maccabi Kiryat Gat who finished first their respective 2013–14 Liga Alef Liga Alef. Ironi Tiberias won the Liga Alef playoffs, and after relegation play-offs replaced Hapoel Katamon Jerusalem in Liga Leumit.

Overview

Stadia and locations

The club is playing their home games at a neutral venue because their own ground does not meet Premier League requirements.While Kiryat Gat Municipal Stadium is under construction. Maccabi Kiryat Gat will host their home games in Sala Stadium.While Yavne Municipal Stadium is under construction. Maccabi Yavne will host their home games in Ness Ziona Stadium until January 2014.

Regular season

Playoffs
Key numbers for pairing determination (number marks position after 30 games):

Top Playoff

Bottom Playoff

Relegation playoff

Relegation playoff
The 14th-placed Hapoel Nazareth Illit faced 2014–15 Liga Alef promotion play-offs winner, Ironi Nesher. The matches took place on May 26 and 29, 2015.

Hapoel Nazareth Illit won 5–1 on aggregate and remained in Liga Leumit. Ironi Nesher remained in Liga Alef.

Season statistics

Scoring

Top scorers

Updated: 25 May 2015Source: Israel Football Association

Discipline
Most yellow cards: 11
Osher Abu (Hapoel Jerusalem)
Netanel Goldman (Hapoel Afula)
Maor Kandil (Hapoel Nir Ramat HaSharon)
Most red cards: 3
Sun Menahem (Hapoel Nir Ramat HaSharon)

See also
 2014–15 Israel State Cup

References

2014–15 in Israeli football leagues
Liga Leumit seasons
Isr